is a passenger railway station  located in the city of  Takarazuka Hyōgo Prefecture, Japan. It is operated by the private transportation company Hankyu Railway.

Lines

Station layout
The station has two ground level side platforms; however, there is no connection between platforms, and passengers wishes to switch platforms must leave the station and re-enter from the other side.

Platforms

Adjacent stations

History
Mefu-Jinja Station opened on March 21, 1914.

Passenger statistics
In fiscal 2019, the station was used by an average of 9357 passengers daily

Surrounding area
Mefu Shrine
Takarazuka Municipal Mefu Elementary School

See also
List of railway stations in Japan

References

External links 

 Mefu Station official home page 

Railway stations in Hyōgo Prefecture
Hankyu Railway Takarazuka Line
Stations of Hankyu Railway
Railway stations in Japan opened in 1914
Takarazuka, Hyōgo